1,8-Cineole 2-exo-monooxygenase (CYP3A4) is an enzyme with systematic name 1,8-cineole,NADPH:oxygen oxidoreductase (2-exo-hydroxylating). This enzyme catalyses the following chemical reaction

 1,8-cineole + NADPH + H+ + O2  2-exo-hydroxy-1,8-cineole + NADP+ + H2O

1,8-Cineole 2-exo-monooxygenase is a heme-thiolate protein (P-450).

References

External links 
 

EC 1.14.13